North Yolla Bolly Mountain (usually referred to as North Yolla Bolly) is a  peak in the Klamath Mountains of the Coast Ranges located in Trinity County, Northern California.

North Yolla Bolly is located only a mile southeast of  Black Rock Mountain, often considered its sister peak. Together, the two summits and the cluster of surrounding peaks in the immediate vicinity are sometimes called the "North Yolla Bolly Mountains", although this grouping, high peaks of the California Coast Ranges, itself a segment the Pacific Coast Ranges that extend from coastal Mexico to Alaska, is not considered a true, stand-apart mountain range. A small glacial tarn, North Yolla Bolly Lake, is located in a cirque on its north slope. The area is accessible by a trail from Stuart Gap. On a clear day, one can see Mount Shasta and Lassen Peak as well as the Sierra Nevada from the summit of North Yolla Bolly.

The mountain divides the headwaters of the South Fork Trinity River and Cottonwood Creek. A spur of the mountain, Skylight Ridge, touches the headwaters of the Middle Fork Eel River, making it the triple point between the Klamath, Sacramento and Eel River systems, the three largest waterways of Northern California.

"Yolla Bolly" is a Wintu word meaning "snowy peak". The mountain is one of numerous high peaks in the alpine Coast Ranges crest––extending from Snow Mountain National Wilderness (north of Lake Berryessa, less than two hours drive from the Bay Area) to Del Norte at the Oregon border––to receive substantial annual snowfall in the winter.

References

Mountains of Tehama County, California
Mountains of Trinity County, California
Klamath Mountains
Shasta-Trinity National Forest
Mountains of Northern California